The Belaya is a river in Irkutsk Oblast and Buryatia in Russia, The area of its basin is .

There are nephrite and graphite deposits in the Belaya basin.

Course
The river is a left tributary of the Angara, which flows into the Bratsk Reservoir. It is formed at the confluence of the Bolshaya Belaya (Big Belaya) and Malaya Belaya (Little Belaya).

Besides the Malaya Belaya, the main tributary is the Urik. There are about 400 lakes in the basin. The Belaya freezes up in October or November and stays under ice until April or May.

See also
List of rivers of Russia

References

External links
Географические названия Восточной Сибири at nature.baikal.ru

Rivers of Irkutsk Oblast
Rivers of Buryatia